The 1977 Nippon Professional Baseball season was the 28th season of operation for the league.

Regular season standings

Central League

Pacific League

Pacific League Playoff
The Pacific League teams with the best first and second-half records met in a best-of-five playoff series to determine the league representative in the Japan Series.

Hankyu Braves won the series 3–2.

Japan Series

Hankyu Braves won the series 4–1.

See also
1977 Major League Baseball season

References

1977 in baseball
1977 in Japanese sport